Chris Evert defeated Helena Suková in the final, 6–7(4–7), 6–1, 6–3 to win the women's singles tennis title at the 1984 Australian Open. It was her second Australian Open singles title and her 16th major singles title overall. With her third round victory, Evert became the first player in the Open Era to win 1,000 matches. She finished the tournament with a 1,003-97 career match record.

Martina Navratilova was the defending champion, but was defeated in the semifinals by Suková. Navratilova entered this tournament with a 70-match winning streak, having won the previous six major singles titles, and attempting to complete a Grand Slam. Her 74-match win streak remains an Open Era record.

Seeds

Qualifying

Draw

Finals

Top half

Section 1

Section 2

Bottom half

Section 3

Section 4

References

External links
 1984 Australian Open – Women's draws and results at the International Tennis Federation

Women's singles
Australian Open (tennis) by year – Women's singles
1984 in Australian women's sport
1984 Virginia Slims World Championship Series